Petäjävesi (lit. "pine water") is a municipality of Finland. It is located in the province of Western Finland, next to the city of Jyväskylä, and is part of the Central Finland region.

Neighbouring municipalities are Jyväskylä, Jämsä, Keuruu, Multia and Uurainen.

The municipality is unilingually Finnish.

The Petäjävesi Old Church, was listed as a UNESCO World Heritage Site in 1994 for its testimony to Nordic church architecture.

Nature
There are all together 99 lakes in Petäjävesi. The biggest lakes are Jämsänvesi-Petäjävesi, Ala-Kintaus and Ylä-Kintaus. Karikkoselkä is a lake in Petäjävesi, which is formed by a meteorite.

The Karikkoselkä impact crater is located southeast of the municipal centre.

Notable people
Mika Aaltola (1969–)
Jarmo Kytölehto (1961–)
Frans Lehtonen (1859–1920)
Olavi Tupamäki (1944–)

Gallery

References

External links

 Municipality of Petäjävesi – Official website, finnish, english

 
Populated places established in 1868